The Women's 400 metre individual medley competition at the 2019 World Championships was held on 28 July 2019.

Records
Prior to the competition, the existing world and championship records were as follows.

Results

Heats
The heats were held on 28 July at 10:30.

Final
The final was held on 28 July at 21:19.

References

Women's 400 metre individual medley
2019 in women's swimming